Bayldonite (BAIL-done-ite) is a rare secondary mineral with the chemical formula PbCu3(AsO4)2(OH)2. It was first discovered in Penberthy Croft Mine, Cornwall, England, United Kingdom. It is named after its discoverer, John Bayldon (1837(8) – 1872). Specimens are also found in  Tsumeb, Namibia, and Arizona, United States. It is sometimes used as a gemstone.

References

Arsenate minerals
Copper minerals
Gemstones
Monoclinic minerals
Minerals in space group 15